The 1994 season is the 72nd season of competitive football in Ecuador.

National leagues

Serie A
Champion: Emelec (7th title)
International cup qualifiers:
1995 Copa Libertadores: Emelec, El Nacional
1995 Copa CONMEBOL: Barcelona, Deportivo Quito
Relegated: Deportivo Cuenca, Valdez

Serie B
Winner: Olmedo (1st title)
Promoted: Olmedo, 9 de Octubre
Relegated: 2 de Marzo, Santos

Segunda
Winner: Deportivo Quevedo (1st title)
Promoted: Deportivo Quevedo, Flamengo

Clubs in international competitions

National teams

Senior team
The Ecuador national team played four friendlies in 1994. Ecuadorian Carlos Torres Garcés assumed management of the national team following the resignation of Montenegrin Dušan Drašković. After two matches, Garcés resigned and was succeeded by Carlos Rón.

External links
 National leagues details on RSSSF

 
1994